Why Sailors Leave Home is a 1930 British comedy film directed by Monty Banks and starring Leslie Fuller, Peter Bernard and Eve Gray. The screenplay concerns a British sailor on shore leave in the Middle East who ends up being mistaken for a Sheikh.

Cast
 Leslie Fuller - Bill Biggles
 Peter Bernard - George
 Eve Gray - Slave Girl
 Gladys Cruickshank - Slave Girl
 Dmitri Vetter - Multhasa
 Frank Melroyd - Captain
 Syd Courtenay - Sheik Sidi Ben
 Lola Harvey - Maya
 Jean Ross - Slave Girl
 Marika Rökk - Slave Girl

References

Bibliography
 Sutton, David R. A chorus of raspberries: British film comedy 1929-1939. University of Exeter Press, 2000.

External links

1930 films
1930 comedy films
Films shot at British International Pictures Studios
1930s English-language films
Films directed by Monty Banks
British comedy films
British black-and-white films
1930s British films